Beth Lord (born 1976) is a Canadian philosopher specialising in the history of philosophy, especially the work and influence of Immanuel Kant and Baruch Spinoza, and contemporary Continental philosophy. She is currently a Professor in the School of Divinity, History and Philosophy at the University of Aberdeen, where she has worked since 2013.

Education and career
Lord was raised in Ontario, and initially studied at the University of Toronto. She intended to study drama, but graduated with a degree in Philosophy and Literary Studies. She went on to the University of Warwick, where she read for an MA in Continental Philosophy and then a doctorate. Her doctoral thesis, which was supervised initially by Andrew Benjamin and then by Stephen Houlgate, was entitled Kant's Productive Ontology: Knowledge, Nature and the Meaning of Being. In the thesis, Lord argues that Kant's ontology is a "productive ontology"; i.e., a theory which rests upon an idea of production. Lord completed her doctorate in 2004. In the same year, she started a permanent position in the philosophy department at the University of Dundee.

In 2010, with funding from the Arts and Humanities Research Council (AHRC), Lord founded the Spinoza Research Network, of which she remains the director. In the same year, she published Spinoza's Ethics: An Edinburgh Philosophical Guide (Edinburgh University Press), a study aid for Spinoza's Ethics (1677). The following year, she published Kant and Spinozism: Transcendental Idealism and Immanence from Jacobi to Deleuze (Palgrave Macmillan), in which she examined the work of Johann Gottfried Herder, Friedrich Heinrich Jacobi, Salomon Maimon and Gilles Deleuze, all of whom, she argues, drew upon both Kant's transcendental idealism and Spinoza's immanence. For Lord, Spinoza's thought is key to understanding the influence of Kantian ideas. In addition to publishing these books, Lord co-edited The Continuum Companion to Continental Philosophy (Continuum, 2010, later republished as The Bloomsbury Companion to Continental Philosophy) with John Ó Maoilearca and was the sole editor of Spinoza Beyond Philosophy (Edinburgh University Press, 2012).<ref>Gatens, Moira (2013). "[ndpr.nd.edu/news/38755-spinoza-beyond-philosophy/ Spinoza Beyond Philosophy]. Notre Dame Philosophical Reviews 4 (2). </ref>

Lord left Dundee in 2012, starting at the University of Aberdeen in January 2013, where she led the AHRC-funded Equalities of Wellbeing project. As of 2019, she is a professor in the School of Divinity, History and Philosophy at Aberdeen, and is serving as the secretary of the British Society for the History of Philosophy and the chair of the Society for European Philosophy.

Select bibliography
Mullarkey, John, and Beth Lord, eds. (2009). The Continuum Companion to Continental Philosophy. London: Continuum.
Lord, Beth (2010). Spinoza's Ethics: An Edinburgh Philosophical Guide. Edinburgh: Edinburgh University Press.
Lord, Beth (2011). Kant and Spinozism: Transcendental Idealism and Immanence from Jacobi to Deleuze. Basingstoke: Palgrave Macmillan.
Lord, Beth, ed. (2012). Spinoza Beyond Philosophy. Edinburgh: Edinburgh University Press.

References

External links
"An atheist's God: the paradox of Spinoza". Interview with Lord for Philosopher's Zone (ABC)
"Spinoza". Episode of Ideas featuring discussion with Lord (CBC)
"The Atheist God: Spinoza's Laws of Religion and Politics". Interview with Lord for Big Ideas'' (ABC).

Living people
1976 births
Canadian women philosophers
Canadian philosophers
Spinoza scholars
Kant scholars
Canadian historians of philosophy
University of Toronto alumni
Alumni of the University of Warwick
Academics of the University of Dundee
Academics of the University of Aberdeen
Writers from Ontario
Canadian women historians